The 2013–14 Houston Cougars women's basketball team represented the University of Houston during the 2013–14 NCAA Division I women's basketball season. The season marked the first for the Cougars as members of the American Athletic Conference. The team was coached by Todd Buchanan until his resignation on December 21, 2013, having played 11 games of their schedule. The remainder of the season was coached by interim head coach Wade Scott. They played their home games at Hofheinz Pavilion.

Schedule and results

|-
!colspan=12 style="background:#CC0000; color:white;"| Exhibition

|-
!colspan=12 style="background:#CC0000; color:white;"| Non-Conference Regular Season

|-
!colspan=12 style="background:#CC0000; color:white;"| American Athletic Conference Regular Season

|-
!colspan=12 style="background:#CC0000; color:white;"| 2014 American Athletic Conference women's basketball tournament

|-

See also
2013–14 Houston Cougars men's basketball team

References

External links
Official website

Houston Cougars women's basketball seasons
Houston
Houston Cougars
Houston Cougars